USS Carolita (PYC-38) was a patrol boat in the United States Navy.

Carolita was built in 1923 as Ripple by Germaniawerft, Kiel, Germany; purchased by the Navy on 1 April 1942 from Herman G. Buckley, of Chicago, Illinois; and commissioned on 6 November 1942.

World War II operations 
Arriving at Boston, Massachusetts, on 16 December 1942, Carolita, operated there until 3 August 1943 when she departed for Key West, Florida, via Norfolk, Virginia, and repairs at Miami, Florida.

Sound School assignment 
She served with the Sound School from 8 September 1943, helping to train men in the techniques of anti-submarine warfare.

Decommissioning 
Carolita was decommissioned on 28 February 1944 and used as a target.

References

External links
 

Patrol vessels of the United States Navy
1923 ships